Hassan Al Qadhi (Arabic:حسن القاضي) (born 8 November 1983) is a Qatari footballer.

External links

References

Qatari footballers
1983 births
Living people
Al Ahli SC (Doha) players
Al-Wakrah SC players
Qatar Stars League players
Qatari Second Division players
Association football midfielders